Aliya Whiteley (born 1974) is a British novelist, short story writer and poet.

Biography

Aliya Whiteley was born in Barnstaple, North Devon, in 1974 and grew up in the seaside town of Ilfracombe which formed the inspiration for many of her stories and novels. She graduated from Ilfracombe College in 1995, gaining a BA (Hons) degree in Theatre, Film and Television Studies from the University of Wales, Aberystwyth.

In 2011 she was awarded an MSc in Library and Information Management by the University of Northumbria; her dissertation involved conducting a case study into the research techniques of modern novelists. She currently lives in West Sussex.

Works

Novels 
Three Things About Me (2006)  
Light Reading (2008) 
The Loosening Skin (2018) 
Skein Island (2019)  
Skyward Inn (2021)

Novellas 
Mean Mode Median (2004) 
The Beauty (2014) 
The Arrival of Missives (2018)

Short stories
Witchcraft in the Harem (collection, 2013) 
"Sieve" (The Guardian 2004)  
"Sebastian Bugs" (Word Riot)  
"1926 in Brazilian Football" (Word Riot)  
"Penelope Napolitano and the Butterflies" (Strange Horizons)  
"Flushed" (3:AM Magazine)  
"Wingspan" (The Future Fire)  
"House of Infinite Diversions" (included in the anthology Strange Little Girls, 2016)  
"Territory Blank" (included in Best of British Science Fiction 2018)

Awards 
Whiteley’s short story "Green River" was awarded second place in the 2012 British Fantasy Society Short Story Competition. Her novel The Loosening Skin was nominated for a British Fantasy Award in 2019.

Whiteley's Jelly Park won the Drabblecast 2007 People's Choice Award for best short story.

References

External links
 Laura Hird 
 Pan Macmillan  
 Macmillan New Writing 

 The story behind The Beauty - Essay by Aliya Whiteley at Upcoming4.me

English women poets
1974 births
People from Ilfracombe
Writers from Barnstaple
Alumni of Aberystwyth University
Alumni of Northumbria University
People from West Sussex
21st-century English novelists
Living people
English women novelists
21st-century English women writers